Young Statues is an American emo band from Philadelphia, Pennsylvania.

History
Young Statues formed in the winter of 2010 after a series of songs that were initially never intended to be released were recorded between friends. Inspired by the response Carmen Cirignano recruited longtime friends and musicians from the Philadelphia music scene, Tom Ryan and Daniel Bogan to record and release what would become Young Statues self-titled debut album in 2011. The following year they would go on to follow up their self-titled album with a four-track EP titled "Covers" which consisting of a collection of cover songs of artists such as Billy Bragg, The Magnetic Fields, New Order and Ryan Adams.

Members
Carmen Cirignano - guitar, vocals
Matt Weber - guitar, vocals
Daniel Bogan - drums
Tom Ryan - bass

Discography

Studio albums
 Young Statues - Run For Cover Records (2011)
 The Flatlands Are Your Friend - Run For Cover Records (2014)

EPs
 Covers - Run For Cover Records (2012)
 Age Isn't Ours - Run For Cover Records (2013)
 Amarillo - Run For Cover Records (2018)

References

External links

Indie rock musical groups from Pennsylvania
Musical groups from Philadelphia
Musical groups established in 2010
Run for Cover Records artists
2010 establishments in Pennsylvania
Doghouse Records artists